Jules–Auguste Béclard (17 December 1817 – 9 February 1887) was a French physiologist born in Paris. He was the son of anatomist Pierre Augustin Béclard (1785–1825).

In 1842 he earned his doctorate in Paris, where he later became a professor of physiology to the Faculté de Médecine. From 1862 to 1872 he was secrétaire annuel to the Académie Nationale de Médecine, where from 1873 to 1887 he served as secrétaire perpétuel.

Béclard was the author of a classic work on human physiology called Traité élémentaire de physiologie humaine comprenant les principales notions de la physiologie comparée (1856). Another noted work of his was Contraction musculaire dans ses rapports avec la température animale, a treatise involving correlation of muscular contraction to temperature.

References 
 Amis et Passionnes du Pere Lachaise (translated biography)

French physiologists
Scientists from Paris
Academic staff of the University of Paris
1817 births
1887 deaths
Burials at Père Lachaise Cemetery